Jesse Turkulainen is a Finnish ice hockey player who currently plays professionally in Finland for Tappara of the SM-liiga. Born in Sweden to Finnish parents, Turkulainen has lived most of his life in Sweden, and holds both Finnish and Swedish citizenship.

See also
Ice hockey in Finland

References

External links

Living people
Tappara players
Finnish ice hockey defencemen
1990 births
Swedish people of Finnish descent